Linisa is a genus (or a subgenus under Polygyra) of air-breathing land snails, terrestrial pulmonate gastropod mollusks in the subfamily Polygyrinae of the family Polygyridae.

Species 
This genus includes the following species and subspecies:
 Linisa acutedentata (W. G. Binney, 1858)
 † Linisa adamnis (Dall, 1890) 
 Linisa albicostulata (Pilsbry, 1896)
 Linisa anilis (Gabb, 1865)
 Linisa ariadnae (L. Pfeiffer, 1848)
 Linisa aulacomphala (Pilsbry & Hinkley, 1907)
 Linisa behri (Gabb, 1865)
 Linisa bicruris (L. Pfeiffer, 1857)
 Linisa cantralli (Solem, 1957)
 Linisa euglypta (Pilsbry, 1896)
 Linisa hertleini (Haas, 1961)
 Linisa hindsi (L. Pfeiffer, 1846)
 Linisa implicata (E. von Martens, 1865)
 Linisa matermontana (Pilsbry, 1896)
 Linisa nelsoni (Dall, 1897)
 Linisa oppilata (Morelet, 1849)
 Linisa pergrandis (Solem, 1959)
 Linisa polita (Pilsbry & Hinkley, 1907)
 Linisa ponsonbyi (Pilsbry, 1896)
 Linisa rhoadsi (Pilsbry, 1899)
 Linisa richardsoni (E. von Martens, 1892)
 Linisa suprazonata (Pilsbry, 1899)
 Linisa tamaulipasensis (I. Lea, 1857)
 Linisa texasiana (Moricand, 1833)
 Linisa ventrosula (L. Pfeiffer, 1846)

References

 Pilsbry, H. A. (1956). Inland Mollusca of Northern Mexico. III. Polygyridae and Potadominae. Proceedings of the Academy of Natural Sciences of Philadelphia. 108: 19-40.
 Bank, R. A. (2017). Classification of the Recent terrestrial Gastropoda of the World. Last update: July 16th, 2017

Polygyridae